The men's double American round event was part of the archery programme at the 1904 Summer Olympics. The competition was held on Monday, 19 September 1904. Twenty two archers competed, all from the host United States. George Bryant won the competition, with Robert Williams finishing second and William Thompson third. A day later, the same three men in the same order would medal in the other 1904 Olympic archery event, the double York round.

Background
This was the only appearance of the event. The 1904 Olympic archery events were part of the 26th Grand Annual Target Meeting of the National Archery Association, with competition open to international competitors though none actually competed. It was thus largely an American national championship, though the International Olympic Committee recognizes the winners as Olympic medalists. Medals were also given out for the best score at each range, though these medals are not recognized as Olympic.

Competition format
An American round consisted of 30 arrows at each of 60, 50, and 40 yard distances. The total number of arrows for the double round was 180. The result was based on points.  A total of 10 points were available. One point was awarded to the archer scoring the highest score at each distance as well as one point for the most hits on target at each distance. Two points were awarded to the archer scoring the highest total score as well as two points for the most total targets hit. Ties were broken on total score, and then on total targets hit.

Schedule 
The double American round event was held on the first day of the three-day archery tournament, along with the women's double Columbia round.

Results
Five men each hit all 60 targets at 40 yards, splitting the point for that category five ways (0.2 each). Bryant had the highest score at that range, with 412. Bryant was the only perfect archer at 50 yards (Williams and Thompson each hit 59 targets) and scored 55 better than the next closest man (366 to Williams's 311) to take both 50-yard points. At 60 yards, Bryant was again the best in targets hit (the only 4 targets he missed in the entire competition were at this distance), but Williams scored higher with 276 to Bryant's 270 despite hitting only 52 targets to Bryant's 56. Bryant finished comfortably ahead in total score and total hits, adding 4 more points to give him 8.2 out of the possible 10 and the gold medal. Williams received silver on the strength of his 60-yard score point, with a total of 1.2 including his share of the 40-yard hits point. The three other men who had shared in that 40-yard hits point placed third through fifth, with ties broken by score to give Thompson the bronze medal.

References

External links
 International Olympic Committee medal winners database
 De Wael, Herman. Herman's Full Olympians: "Archery 1904".

Men's double American round
Men's events at the 1904 Summer Olympics